Van Orin is an unincorporated community in Bureau County, Illinois, United States. Van Orin is located along Illinois Route 92, east of Ohio and northwest of La Moille.

The community is named after Van Orin Cresap, a predominant citizen and local farmer.  A post office was established in 1872.

Van Orin Elementary School is located in the community.  The school serves the La Moille Community Unit School District No. 303.

Chartered in 1919, the First State Bank of Van Orin is also located in the community.

References

External links
 Van Orin Elementary School

Unincorporated communities in Bureau County, Illinois
Unincorporated communities in Illinois
1872 establishments in Illinois